Saint Croix is a wine grape variety developed in 1981 by Elmer Swenson of Osceola, Wisconsin  It goes by the synonyms Saint Croy,  E.S. 2-3-21, and Elmer Swenson 242  It is a cross of V. labrusca x V. riparia grapes with cultivar crosses [E.S. 283 (Minn. 78 x Seibel 1000) x E.S. 193 (Minn. 78 x ‘Seneca’)]

References

Grape varieties
Polk County, Wisconsin